The Pageant (also called The Pageant Concert Nightclub) is a popular American nightclub in St. Louis, Missouri.

Built as a dedicated nightclub, The Pageant first opened its doors on October 19, 2000. It was named for a "long-gone Pageant movie theater" that once stood three blocks away. Located in St. Louis at 6161 Delmar Boulevard on the east end of the Delmar Loop, The Pageant has been described by the Riverfront Times as "St. Louis' premier midsize venue".

In their worldwide ranking of top nightclubs by ticket sales, Pollstar ranked The Pageant 4th in 2008 and 6th in 2014.  Alex Young, writing for Consequence of Sound, said in 2009 that The Pageant put on great shows in a more-intimate setting than other venues which failed the test of time; he specifically called out the sound system, the parking available, and The Halo Bar.

References

External links
 

2000 establishments in Missouri
buildings and structures in St. Louis
music venues in St. Louis
nightclubs in the United States